"Kamp Krustier" is the sixteenth episode of the twenty-eighth season of the American animated television series The Simpsons, and the 612th episode of the series overall. It aired in the United States on Fox on March 5, 2017 and in the United Kingdom on Sky 1 on May 5, 2017. The follow-up to the season 4 episode "Kamp Krusty", the episode was directed by Rob Oliver and features a script by David M. Stern, who had not written for the show in 18 years. In the episode, Bart and Lisa return from Kamp Krusty traumatized and Homer becomes a more productive worker.

Plot
The story is set right after the events of "Kamp Krusty". Santa's Little Helper follows the trail of Homer and Marge's clothes, leading him to Bart's treehouse, where they were having sex. Chief Wiggum and Officer Lou arrive at the scene, having been called by Ned. Homer tells them the kids are fine, before showing them a postcard from Kamp Krusty. The scene switches to the camp, where everything is getting ruined by Bart and the other bullies.

The traumatized kids return on a bus, guided by Krusty. The kids are taken to therapy and the therapist says to Marge to keep an eye on Bart. Back at home, Bart fakes PTSD and interrupts Homer and Marge's sexual activity. The next day, Bart stays at home watching TV. With Bart on their bed and being unable to have fun with Marge, Homer goes to work early and finds out what happens when the Power Plant is empty.

Bart has a nightmare of the camp when they went on the canoe and asks Lisa for help. Homer gets more productive than ever and gets a raise by Mr. Burns while Bart and Lisa go to the amusement park where they cut the line thanks to the trauma they suffered from.

Homer refuses to have sex with Marge and she thinks they need the help of a therapist too who suggests taking the kids back to Kamp Krusty, which was transformed into an adult retreat called Klub Krusty. Bart and Lisa find a cabin they have visited after escaping with the canoe and remember another kid with them named Charlie who fell in the rapids and never came back up. Marge and Homer have some fun at the club while Bart and Lisa report Charlie missing to the club security which reveals he's alive, and also that Charlie is not a kid but a little person.

During the credits, shots of Homer Simpson clones are shown at work as a Barry White-like singer is heard singing in the background about not wanting to be intimate with the object of the song.

Reception
"Kamp Krustier" was watched by 2.56 million people and scored a 1.1 rating with a 4 share, making it Fox's highest rated show of the night.

Dennis Perkins of The A.V. Club gave the episode a C− stating, "Well, no one can accuse The Simpsons of trampling all over one of its all-time best episodes. Actually, wait—I can, as the 24-seasons-removed 'Kamp Krustier' finds a way to revisit the classic Simpsons episode 'Kamp Krusty' without expanding on it, deconstructing it, or even making a memorable travesty of it. That long-absent original 'Kamp Krusty' writer David M. Stern returned to the show as main credited writer for the first time in some 18 years and produced something so innocuously unmemorable is a genuine disappointment."

Tony Sokol of Den of Geek gave the episode four out of five stars stating "'Kamp Krustier' is a flashback episode that's heavy on couples' therapy and repression, but don't let that fool you, it's still a foolhardy enterprise".

References

External links
 

2017 American television episodes
The Simpsons (season 28) episodes